Carmen Lozano (1930–2017) was a Spanish television and film actress. She was the daughter of the actress Mercedes Muñoz Sampedro. Known as Carmen Lozano, María del Carmen Lozano Muñoz, died on February 19, 2017, in the Santo Angel Chapel in Murcia.

Selected filmography
 Last Day (1952)
 Women's Town (1953)
 Alfonso XII and María Cristina (1960)
 Maribel and the Strange Family (1960)
 Camerino Without a Folding Screen (1967)
 Black Litter (1977)
 Spoiled Children (1980)

References

Bibliography 
 Peter Cowie & Derek Elley. World Filmography: 1967. Fairleigh Dickinson University Press, 1977.

External links 
 

1930 births
2009 deaths
Spanish television actresses
Spanish film actresses